Edwin Grosvenor may refer to:
 Edwin A. Grosvenor (1845–1936), historian and author
 Edwin S. Grosvenor (born 1951), writer and the editor-in-chief of American Heritage magazine